Adithattu is a 2022 Indian Malayalam-language action thriller film directed by Jijo Anthony and starring Sunny Wayne and Shine Tom Chacko.

Cast 
Sunny Wayne as Marcos
Shine Tom Chacko as Ambross
Alexander Prasanth as Srank Raayan
Ani as Mullan
Joseph Yesudas as Kambli
Murugan Martine as Nelson
Sabumon Abdusamad

Reception 
A critic from The Times of India wrote that "The film focuses quite a bit on the fishermen’s work in the deep sea and their personalities, with the story feeling like an afterthough". A critic from Manorama Online wrote that "The movie has done complete justice to the subject it deals with and the treatment it has pitched". A critic from Cinema Express wrote that "Adithattu has two principal advantages: a nail-biting third act and a 90-min duration".

References

External links
 

Indian drama films
Films shot in Kozhikode
2022 thriller films